The Li Auto One (literal translation: dream or ideal ONE) is a luxury mid-size crossover SUV by Li Xiang, and it is also the first vehicle from the Chinese automobile manufacturer.

As of 2021 it has the second-longest electric range of any PHEV in the world (180 km in the NEDC cycle) after the BMW i3 120 Ah REx (203 km in the EPA cycle).

History 
The One was presented in April 2019 at the Shanghai Auto Show. It has been in series production in Changzhou since November 2019. The first vehicles were delivered in China from early 2020.

After 3 years of presence on the Chinese market, car has been discontinued in October 2022 to make way for the brand new model Li Auto L8, causing controversy and backlash in social media amidst sudden change of narrative. Earlier in 2022, company claimed both SUVs will be sold simultaneously.

Specifications 

The vehicle can be described as a range extended vehicle or as a PHEV. It has two electric motors: a  motor in the front and a  motor in the rear. It is also equipped with a front-mounted 1.2-litre turbocharged 3-cylinder petrol engine with a  petrol tank capacity. The petrol engine is a range extender for the electric motors; it does not directly power the wheels.

Charging to 80% takes 40 minutes with a fast charger. A full charge at 200V takes 6 hours.

It is an SUV, available with six or seven seats in three rows. The interior has several screens, and the infotainment system runs on Android Auto, powered by a Qualcomm Snapdragon 820A processor. The Li Xiang One will be equipped with a Level 2 Autonomous Driving system.

Competing models include the BYD Tang PHEV, the BYD Tang 600/600D and the NIO ES8 (although the first one has a considerably smaller battery, and the two others are not PHEVs but pure electric vehicles with much larger batteries).

The combination of a small internal combustion engine with a battery that is noticeably larger than in most PHEVs resembles the BMW i3 REx.

Sales

As of 1 April 2021, the vehicle sold in over 45,000 units in China since its market debut.

Among those plug-in vehicles that retain an internal combustion engine (i.e. among PHEVs and EREVs), the best-selling vehicle in China was the Li Xiang One, both in 2020 and in Q1 2021.

Price

As of January 2021, the Li One price is 339,900 RMB ($52,500)

References

Cars of China
All-wheel-drive vehicles
Cars introduced in 2019
Mid-size sport utility vehicles
Hybrid electric cars
Plug-in hybrid vehicles
First car made by manufacturer